Margarosticha sphenotis is a moth in the family Crambidae. It was described by Edward Meyrick in 1887. It is found in Australia, where it has been recorded from New South Wales, Queensland and the Northern Territory.

References

Acentropinae
Moths described in 1887